Gerry Breen is an Irish former Fine Gael politician and Lord Mayor of Dublin.

Born in Clontarf in Dublin, educated in Coláiste Mhuire and UCD (B Comm), Breen first entered politics in 1981 when he joined Fine Gael. At the 1999 local elections, he was elected to Dublin City Council representing the five seat Clontarf local electoral area. He served as Fine Gael group leader on the council from 2004 until 2010.

Elected as Lord Mayor of Dublin in June 2010, he campaigned to have a greater distribution of drug maintenance treatment out of Dublin city centre and into the suburbs and also called for anti-begging laws to be introduced.

He ran at the 2011 general election for the Dublin North-West constituency, despite not being a resident in the constituency obtained 2,988 votes (9.1%). He was not elected, being beaten for the last seat by Labour Party candidate John Lyons by 2,000 votes.

He was a member of the European Committee of the Regions, and a rapporteur on the European Globalisation Fund for the period 2010 to 2014. In December 2011, he was elected as Chair of the Fine Gael Council of Local Representatives – a body representing the hundreds of Fine Gael councillors throughout the country.

He runs a business "First Aid Supplies" based in Balbriggan since 2002.

He lost his council seat at the 2014 local elections.

References

 

1957 births
Living people
Alumni of University College Dublin
Fine Gael politicians
Lord Mayors of Dublin
People educated at Coláiste Mhuire, Dublin
People from Clontarf, Dublin